The Santokhi cabinet has governed Suriname since 16 July 2020. It was formed by President Chan Santokhi after the 2020 Surinamese general election.

Members

References 

Current governments
2020 in Suriname
Cabinets established in 2020
Surinamese cabinets